Matthew Stanley Johnson (born 14 December 1966) is an American atmospheric chemistry scientist at Atmospheric Research Center at the University of Copenhagen. 
Johnson has made contributions to several areas of chemistry, including kinetics, spectroscopy, isotope effects and application of atmospheric chemistry knowledge to air pollution control systems.

Johnson studied chemistry at S.A. Macalester College, Saint Paul, Minnesota. In 1995, he was promoted to the Spectroscopy of Reactive Molecules and Cluster Compounds at the California Institute of Technology, Caltech.

After several stations in Minnesota and Caltech, he was a student of the Fulbright program at the MAX-Lab accelerator at the Swedish University of Lund, and in 1998 became an assistant professor in University of Copenhagen. In the field of kinetics he coordinates the Nordic Network for Chemical Kinetics (NoNeCK), he has five filed patents and over 250 publications in internationally referenced scientific journals.
In 2012, Johnson and Harnung published their book titled "Chemistry and the Environment". 
Two start-up company in air cleaning industries are established based on Johnson's scientific results.
Johnson is married and has two children.

Selected publications
 Y. Ueno, M. S. Johnson, S. O. Danielache, C. Eskebjerg, A. Pandey, N. Yoshida, Geological Sulfur Isotopes Indicate Elevated OCS in the Archean Atmosphere, Solving the Faint Young Sun Paradox, Proceedings of the National Academy of Sciences, in press, 2009.
 S. O. Danielache, S. Nanbu, C. Eskebjerg, M. S. Johnson, N. Yoshida, Carbonyl Sulfide Isotopologues: Ultraviolet Absorption Cross Sections and Stratospheric Photolysis, Journal of Chemical Physics, 131, 024307, 2009.
 E. J. K. Nilsson, O. J. Nielsen, M. S. Johnson, M. D. Hurley, T. J. Wallington, Atmospheric Chemistry of cis-CF3CH=CHF: Products of OH Radical Initiated Oxidation and Kinetics of Reactions with Chlorine Atoms, OH Radicals, and O3, Chemical Physics Letter, 473, 233 – 237, 2009

References

External links
Home page

American atmospheric scientists
Atmospheric chemists
Academic staff of the University of Copenhagen
California Institute of Technology alumni
Macalester College alumni
21st-century American inventors
Living people
1966 births